Claude de Jongh (1605, Utrecht – 1663, Utrecht), was a Dutch Golden Age painter.

Biography
According to the Netherlands Institute for Art History he was a landscape painter who travelled to England and is registered there several times from 1625-1650.

References

Claude de Jongh on Artnet

1605 births
1663 deaths
Dutch Golden Age painters
Dutch male painters
Artists from Utrecht